Ris-Orangis is a commune in the southern suburbs of Paris, France.

Inhabitants of Ris-Orangis are known as Rissois.

History
The commune of Ris-Orangis was created in 1793 by the merger of the commune of Ris with the commune of Orangis. The commune town hall (mairie) is located in Ris.

Population

Education
 3,712 students attend municipal schools of Ris-Orangis. They are:
 Seven preschools (écoles maternelles): des Fauvettes, de la Ferme du Temple, Adrien Guerton, Moulin à Vent, Michel Ordener, Pablo Picasso, and Jacques Derrida.
 Six elementary schools: Jules Boulesteix, de la Ferme du Temple, Adrien Guerton, Moulin à Vent, Orangis, Michel Ordener

Junior high schools include:
 Collège Albert Camus
 Collège Jean Lurçat

There is one senior high school, Lycée Pierre Mendès France.

Personalities
Chris Gadi, footballer
Sébastien Haller, footballer
Jacques Derrida
Lloyd Cole, Musician who played infamous gig at the illustrious Le Plan venue
Rory Gallagher, Musician who performed his final concert in France at the Le Plan rock club, after his death a street close to the venue was renamed in his honour to: Rue Rory Gallagher

Transport
Ris-Orangis is served by three stations on Paris RER line D: Ris-Orangis, Grand-Bourg, and Orangis – Bois de l'Épine.

See also
Communes of the Essonne department

References

External links

Official website 

Mayors of Essonne Association 

Communes of Essonne